A mortsafe or mortcage was a construction designed to protect graves from disturbance and used in the United Kingdom. Resurrectionists and Night Doctors had supplied schools of anatomy since the early 18th century. This was due to the necessity for medical students to learn anatomy by attending dissections of human subjects, which was frustrated by the very limited allowance of dead bodies – for example the corpses of executed criminals – granted by the government, which controlled the supply.

Official inaction
The British authorities turned a blind eye to grave-rifling because surgeons and students were working to advance medical knowledge. They kept publicity to a minimum to prevent people from realising what was happening. The cases of grave-robbing that came to light caused riots, damage to property and even fatal attacks. In the early 19th century, with the great increase in numbers of schools and students, there was continual rifling of secluded graveyards, fights in city burial grounds and other disturbances. Men were employed to steal bodies and transport them from place to place, even across the sea, for sale to medical schools. Revelations led to public outrage, particularly in Scotland, where there was great reverence for the dead and a literal belief in the Resurrection. It was popularly believed that the dead could not rise in an incomplete state.

Precautions

People were determined to protect the graves of newly deceased friends and relatives. The rich could afford heavy table tombstones, vaults, mausoleums and iron cages around graves. The poor began to place flowers and pebbles on graves to detect disturbances. They dug heather and branches into the soil to make disinterment more difficult. Large stones, often coffin-shaped, sometimes the gift of a wealthy man to the parish, were placed over new graves. Friends and relatives took turns or hired men to watch graves through the hours of darkness. Watch-houses were sometimes erected to shelter the watchers. One watch-house in Edinburgh is a three-storey castellated building with windows. Watching societies were often formed in towns, one in Glasgow having 2,000 members. Many kirk session houses were used by watchers, but graves were still violated.

Mortsafe

The mortsafe was invented around 1816. These were iron or iron-and-stone devices of great weight, in many different designs. Often they were complex heavy iron contraptions of rods and plates, padlocked together; examples have been found close to all Scottish medical schools. A plate was placed over the coffin and rods with heads were pushed through holes in it. These rods were kept in place by locking a second plate over the first to form extremely heavy protection. It would be removed by two people with keys. They were placed over the coffins for about six weeks, then removed for further use when the body inside was sufficiently decayed. There is a model of a mortsafe of this type in Marischal Museum, Aberdeen. Sometimes a church bought them and hired them out. Societies were also formed to purchase them and control their use, with annual membership fees, and charges made to non-members.

Vaults and watch-houses

Publicity surrounding the crimes of Burke and Hare heightened the fear felt by many people. It was about this time that vaults – repositories for dead bodies – were built by public subscription in Scotland, with their use governed by rules and regulations. Some of these were above ground while others – mainly in Aberdeenshire – were wholly or partly underground. In one Aberdeenshire village, Udny Green, the morthouse is a circular building with a thick studded wooden door and an inner iron door. Inside there is a turntable to accommodate seven coffins. A coffin would be moved round as further ones were added and by the time it reappeared the body would be of no use to the dissectionists.

Likely all communities near the Scottish schools of medicine in Edinburgh, Glasgow and Aberdeen employed some means of protecting the dead. Some used both mortsafes and watching. There are watch-houses in the remoter Scottish areas, in the Borders, and two have been found in the English county of Northumberland.

Surviving examples

Surviving mortsafes are generally found in churchyards and burial grounds; some are very broken and rusting away. One has been restored and hung in a church porch, with an explanatory note, by the East Lothian Antiquary Society. There are one or two in museums but those on display rarely have any indication of what they are or how they were used. Some documents appertaining to mortsafes and other protection devices are still in existence in libraries and record offices. There are two mortsafes in reasonable condition outside the old Aberfoyle church in Stirling, which was fully 30 miles from the nearest School of Anatomy in Glasgow.  One can also be found, in a slightly rusted state, to the right of the door outside Skene Parish Church, Kirkton of Skene, Aberdeenshire.   Another in reasonable condition can be found in the kirkyard at the remote hamlet of Towie, west of Alford. Tullibody, as well as having a famous stone coffin, is also recorded to have had an iron coffin case as an attempt to thwart local body-snatchers.

References

External links

 YouTube video and commentary on a mortsafe in Prestwick, Ayrshire.
 Echoes of the Scottish Resurrection Men

Death customs
Crime prevention
Body snatching